The Best of the Meters is a compilation album by the funk group The Meters released in 1975. All tracks had been previously released as singles.

Track listing

Personnel
Credits adapted in part from AllMusic.

 Art Neville – composer, keyboards, vocals
 Ziggy Modeliste – composer, drums, vocals
 Leo Nocentelli – composer, guitar, background vocals
 George Porter Jr. – composer, bass, background vocals
 Cyril Neville – composer, drums, percussion, vocals
 Allen Toussaint – producer 
 Marshall Sehorn – producer
 Jeff Hannusch – liner notes

References

1975 greatest hits albums
The Meters albums